Nkrumah is a surname. Notable people with the surname include:

 Kwame Nkrumah (1909–1972), the first Prime Minister and then first President of Ghana.
 Fathia Nkrumah (1932–2007), wife of Kwame Nkrumah and First Lady of Ghana.
 Gamal Nkrumah (born 1959), Ghanaian journalist.
 Samia Nkrumah (born 1960), Ghanaian journalist and politician.
 Kwame Nkrumah-Acheampong (born 1979), Ghanaian skier.
Kojo Oppong Nkrumah, Ghanaian, journalist, politician and lawyer

See also 
 Nkrumah University, a university in Zambia.
 Kwame Nkrumah University of Science and Technology, a university in Kumasi, Ghana.
 Kwame Nkrumah Ideological Institute, a former educational institute in Winneba, Ghana.
 Kwame Nkrumah Mausoleum, a memorial in Accra, Ghana, dedicated to Kwame Nkrumah.
 FPSO Kwame Nkrumah, an oil storage and offloading vessel named after Kwame Nkrumah.

Surnames of Akan origin